Jean Tixier may refer to:

 Jean Max Tixier (1935–2009), French poet
 Jean-Louis Tixier-Vignancour (1907–1989), French lawyer and politician; 1965 presidential candidate
 Jean Tixier de Ravisi (c. 1480–1524), French Renaissance humanist, author, and scholar; former rector of the University of Paris

See also
 Tixier (disambiguation)